is a sports comedy manga series written by Roots and illustrated by Piyo. It was serialized in Earth Star Entertainment's Comic Earth Star from February 2012 to January 2018. The name of the series is a pun on the Japanese word for tennis, . The manga has been adapted into an anime television series, which ran from 2012 to 2017.

Teekyu also had a spinoff comedy manga series, also serialized in Comic Earth Star, named , translated as "I am Takamiya Nasuno!" (full name ), featuring one of the main characters of Teekyu in her own adventures. It has had two tankōbon releases, and also received a 12-episode anime adaptation in 2015.

Another spin-off manga series named  which features the Tennis Club's opponents was released in 2015. It has had three tankōbon releases so far, and also received a 12-episode anime adaptation in 2016.

Plot
The story follows the everyday lives of four girls of the Kameido High School's tennis club. The series' focus is not really on tennis, but on the wacky and eccentric characters, with strange object associations and even stranger misconceptions, on their many random adventures. These adventures have included traveling to an army base, going skiing, helping a cake shop owner with financial troubles, and helping an alien refuel her spaceship.

Characters

Yuri is the only member of the club who actually knows how to play tennis. She is considered the only normal girl in the entire group who takes things seriously, much to her chagrin. She plays the straight man, often giving surprised remarks to the other girls' shocking behavior. She has a younger brother in middle school named Yota.

Kanae is a second year student though she does not act like it at times. She likes to do things that break norms, such as getting a tennis racket with strings made from her grandmother's hair or sleeping by standing up and with her head against the wall, and sometimes even breaks laws of physics, such as sinking into solid ground or splitting herself in two. She tends to freak out Yuri and/or Nasuno in the process.

Nasuno hails from a rich family. Having returned from a trip in Ngaoundéré, Cameroon, she wants to try out for the tennis club, though she has no idea how to play begin the most normal of the Second Year students. If Yuri was not present, she acts as the straight man. Nasuno is capable of providing for her own and other characters' outlandish ideas with her vast amounts of wealth. In her spinoff series, Takamiya Nasuno Desu!, she spends her summer at her family's vacation cottage, relaxing and ordering around Yota.

Marimo is another second year student who hails from the same school as the other members. She has a large number of misconceptions about the world, and her antics tend to get herself and others in trouble, and sometimes in harm. Examples include wearing and actually eating a girls' panties and kidnapping a child. She does have a kind nature to her, despite her lack of maturity and self-control. Despite being the crazier member of the club, she ends up being the voice of reason when the others aren't around.

An alien from another planet, she crash lands on Earth due to her spaceship losing fuel, and she meets Marimo. Marimo and Tomarin then become roommates and friends. She is pretty cheerful, but can be easily scared. Tomarin has humorous misconceptions about Earth, which are not helped by Marimo's own misconceptions.

A classmate of Yuri's, she works for the school's newspaper. She has a lot of curiosity, but generally means well. She seems to have abnormal priorities in her life, and focuses on things that other people wouldn't focus on.

Udonko's older sister. She works as a bhikkhu (exorcist).

Kinako is a second year student.

Kurumi is a third year student.

Ayako is a third year student.

Nishi is a first year student.

Sora is a tennis club adviser, former Usakame high school tennis club member.

Yuri's younger brother who seems to live a rather average life. Nasuno employed him as her butler during their summer break, often having him perform meaningless tasks or tasks with outrageous conditions or rules. Throughout the spinoff, Takamiya Nasuno Desu!, he works as Nasuno's Butler and acts as the straight man, giving snappy or confused remarks to the actions of Nasuno and her weird family. He tends to be the responsible person in situations where Nasuno's family is not.

Udonko and Annenkov's grandfather.

Kanae's grandmother.

She is acquainted with Kanae, came to the migrant from the Yucatan Peninsula.

She is a cousin of Kanae, kindergarten staff that Bobby is management.

He is acquainted with Kanae, The director of the kindergarten. He is former United States Navy SEALs.

Nasuno's mother, she looks extremely young for her age. She is pretty energetic and sometimes direct. She tends to join Nasuno and Yota on their adventures, but is generally care-free, leaving Yota to have to be the responsible one.

Nasuno's father, he looks like Colonel Sanders.

The manager of the cake shop he has hired the Nasuno's father.

She is a maid of Takamiya house, former Usakame high school tennis club member, a junior of Sora.

Marimo's mother.

She is Kinako's classmate, Kameido junior high school classmate of Nasuno.

She is Kinako's classmate, Kameido junior high school classmate of Nasuno.

She is Nishi's classmate, tennis is good, but not in the tennis club.

She is Kurumi and Ayako's classmate, badminton club member.

She is Kurumi and Ayako's classmate, badminton club member.

Media

Manga

Teekyu
The Teekyu manga series is written by Roots and illustrated by Piyo. Its first chapter was published by Earth Star Entertainment in Comic Earth Star 12th issue, released on February 10, 2012, and the series has also been compiled in 15 tankōbon volumes. On March 3, 2021, a one-shot was published. The one-shot takes place a decade after the end of the manga.

Takamiya Nasuno Desu!
The Takamiya Nasuno Desu! manga is also written by Roots and illustrated by Piyo, and also published by Earth Star Entertainment. It is a spinoff of Teekyu that focuses on the daily life of Takamiya Nasuno. It has, as of October 10, 2015, had two tankōbon volumes released.

Usakame

Anime

Announcement of an anime adaptation of Teekyu came in August 2012, alongside the release of the first tankobon. The announcement came five months after the manga was first published, the fastest manga-release-to-anime-announcement time that Earth Star Entertainment has ever had. Each episode of the anime is about 2 minutes long, so characters speak and actions are performed at a very quick pace, with shortcuts used to save time on animation sometimes. Shin Itagaki is the director and writer for each season.

The series has had nine seasons so far. The first season aired between October 7 and December 23, 2012, the second one between July 7 and September 22, 2013, and the third one between October 6 and December 22, 2013. The fourth season aired from April 6, 2015 to June 22, 2015. The fifth season began airing on July 6, 2015. The sixth season aired from October 5, 2015 to December 21, 2015. The seventh season ran from January 12, 2016 to March 29, 2016. The eight season ran from on October 5, 2016 to December 21, 2016. The ninth season aired from July to September 2017.

Takamiya Nasuno Desu! received a 12-episode adaptation, and aired on the same days as the fourth season of Teekyu, from April 6, 2015 to June 22, 2015. Like Teekyu, each episode is two minutes in length, and character speech and actions are performed at a quick pace. Shin Itagaki is also the director and writer for this series.

Usakame received a 12-episode adaptation from April 11, 2016 to June 27, 2016.

Stage play
There was a stage play adaptation of Teekyu called  ("Stage Play Edition Teekyu: The Times to Come Across with Senpai"), about a musical being put on by the tennis club members during their high school's Culture Festival. The play was performed at Japan Newart College Omori Campus Theater in Tokyo, Japan, from July 29 and August 2, 2015.

Reception
Chris Beveridge of The Fandom Post, reviewing the first three episodes, gave the anime a C, stating that he enjoyed the comedy, but the short length of the episodes and the quick pace ruined the experience. Ryan Hand of B-TEN, reviewing the first 3 seasons, gave the show a 5.25 out of 10, again stating that he enjoyed the show and its characters (despite there being no character development). However, he criticized the poor animation and art, although he commented on how it fits the fast-paced action of the show. It has been suggested that the show has not been as well received outside of Japan due to the language barrier for non-native speakers, causing difficulty in following the unusually fast-paced dialogue.

The official Twitter account for the franchise has over 20,000 followers.

References

External links
Official anime website 

2012 anime television series debuts
2012 manga
Comedy anime and manga
Earth Star Entertainment manga
MAPPA
Shōnen manga
Tennis in anime and manga
Tokyo MX original programming